Heydarabad-e Chah Narenj (also Romanized as Ḩeydarābād-e Chāh Nārenj; also known as Heidar Abad Kahnooj and Ḩeydarābād) is a village in Hur Rural District, in the Central District of Faryab County, Kerman Province, Iran. At the 2006 census, its population was 835, in 169 families.

References 

Populated places in Faryab County